Malmö Theatre Academy is a theatre academy at Lund University in Malmö, Sweden.
The theater college educates actors, playwrights and performance artists. Over the years the school has trained over 500 actors. The academy offers Bachelor's degree, Master's degree and Doctorate degree programs as well as postgraduate education and research with artistic focus. 

Malmö Theatre Academy was started at the Malmö City Theatre in 1944. Starting in 1945–46 and coherently from 1952,  Swedish film and theatre director  Ingmar Bergman (1918–2007) working as a director, playwright and artistic director at Malmö City Theatre. From 1953, he also became involved in the Malmö Theatre Academy.

In 1964 the school became the National Swedish School of Acting, Malmö and in 1977 became a part of Lund University. Malmö Theater Academy is housed in the    Kulturhuset Mazetti cultural complex on Bergsgatan in Malmö.

References

External links
Teaterhögskolan i Malmö website

Drama schools in Sweden
Theatres in Sweden
Buildings and structures in Malmö
Lund University